Sir Ralph Abercrombie Campbell was Chief Justice of the Bahamas from 10 August 1960 to 31 May 1970.

References 

Colony of the Bahamas judges
Year of birth missing
Year of death missing
Knights Bachelor